Herbert Weston Edmunds (1881 – 27 September 1954) was a British marine insurance underwriter and philatelist. Edmunds was president of the Royal Philatelic Society London 1950–53.

Edmunds was educated at Highgate School and the University of Cambridge. He was a member of Lloyd's of London for more than 30 years. He joined the Royal Philatelic Society in 1931 and specialised in the philately of Hanover, Tuscany, and Oldenburg.

References 

British philatelists
Presidents of the Royal Philatelic Society London
Insurance underwriters
Alumni of the University of Cambridge
People educated at Highgate School
1881 births
1954 deaths